The 2004 FIRS Intercontinental Cup was the eighth edition of the roller hockey tournament known as the Intercontinental Cup, played between 14 and 16 of May, 2004 (after a five-year hiatus). This edition rolled back to a two-legged final. HC Liceo La Coruña won the cup, defeating CDU Estudiantil.

Matches

See also
FIRS Intercontinental Cup

References

2004 in Spanish sport
International roller hockey competitions hosted by Spain
FIRS Intercontinental Cup
2004 in roller hockey